"Blow the Man Down" is an English sea shanty, listed as 2624 in the Roud Folk Song Index. The lyric "Blow the man down" can be interpreted in a number of ways. Some see it as a reference to a sailor being struck with a fist. Given the shanty's theme of being essentially "Shanghaied" by an attractive young woman, the phrase could refer to finishing one's beer before sailing—a reading supported by verses which imply that many who worked on the "Black Ball" did so reluctantly and had little experience as sailors. A third, somewhat implausible reading is that this phrase refers to blowing the ship (man-o'-war) over in a gale. However, this interpretation doesn't match well with the entire phrase: "Give me some time to blow the man down" since it is unlikely that a sailor would ask for additional time to have his ship capsized. This reading also reads "man" as a shortened version of "man o' war," and there are no other references to the phrase referring to a man-of-war, nor was any one of the ships in the Black Ball line a man o' war.

History

Written history 
Contemporary publications and the memories of individuals, in later publications, put the existence of this shanty by the 1860s. The Syracuse Daily Courier, July 1867, quoted a lyric from the song, which was said to be used for hauling halyards on a steamship bound from New York to Glasgow.
In 1879, George Haswell was passenger aboard another steamship, from London to Sydney, at which time he noted some of the shanties of the crew. These were published in the ship's own fortnightly newspaper, The Parramatta Sun, and they included a full set of lyrics for "Blow the Man Down." The lyrics take up the theme of a ship of the Black Ball Line, and include the refrains, "Wae! Hae! Blow the man down / Give me some time to blow the man down." Although Haswell's article did not receive wide circulation, it did find its way into the hands of Laura Alexandrine Smith, whose own large collection of sailors' songs, The Music of the Waters (1888), was one of the first to be widely available. Smith reprinted the lyrics gathered by Haswell. She also presented a different version of the song that she herself presumably collected, and which was said to be used for hoisting topsail yards. Its lyrics include reference to a sailor coming home to England from Hong Kong, as well as meeting a girl on "Winchester Street."

Early recordings 
Many recordings were made in the first half of the twentieth century of former sailors singing the shanty. Percy Grainger recorded a man named Tom Roberts in Chelsea, London singing a version in 1908, which can be heard online via the British Library Sound Archive. The folklorist James Madison Carpenter made recordings of the song in England, Scotland and Wales in the early 1930s, all of which are available on the Vaughan Williams Memorial Library. Helen Hartness Fladers recorded several versions sung by former sailors in the 1940s in New England, whilst Helen Creighton recorded several Nova Scotian versions in the 1940s and 50s.

Lyrics

Like most chanties of this type, "Blow the Man Down" was sung to a flexible combination of customary verses, floating verses from within the general chanty repertoire, and verses improvised in the moment or peculiar to individual singers. The song was of indefinite length, and created by supplying solo verses to an invariable two-part refrain. The structure is as follows:

Solo verse couplets documented to have been sung to "Blow the Man Down" include the following from sailors of the 19th century.

Another version 
An article by Felix Riesenberg, who trained and served as an officer in the Merchant Marine in the 1890s, depicts earlier sailors singing these plainer work lyrics not specifically about the Black Ball line. The men are raising the topsail on a  merchant ship to get under sail from New York to Liverpool, with the chantey led by a sailor named Jimmie:

References in popular Culture
An offbeat version of the song is sung by the officers and crew of the USS Stingray led by Lieutenant Commander Tom Dodge (Kelsey Grammer) in the 1996 film Down Periscope as they arrange the transfer of Lieutenant Martin Pascal (Rob Schneider) off the ship and make him walk the plank.

References

External links
Lyrics
Alternate lyrics

British folk songs
Sea shanties
Songs about oceans and seas
Songs about sailors
Burl Ives songs
The Muppets songs
Songs about Liverpool
English folk songs
English children's songs
Traditional children's songs